Christian Miller may refer to:

 Christian William Miller (1921–1995), American artist and model
 Christian Miller (American football) (born 1996), American football defensive end
 Christian B. Miller, American philosopher
 T. Christian Miller (born 1970), investigative reporter, editor, author, and war correspondent

See also

 Chris Miller (disambiguation)